Youtiao, known in Southern China as Yu Char Kway is a long golden-brown deep-fried strip of wheat flour dough of Chinese origin and (by a variety of other names) also popular in other East and Southeast Asian cuisines.

Conventionally, youtiao are lightly salted and tearable. Youtiao are normally eaten at breakfast as an accompaniment for rice congee, soy milk or regular milk blended with sugar. Youtiao may also be known as a Chinese cruller, Chinese oil stick, Chinese donut [sticks], and fried breadstick, among others.

In other Asian countries, they may also be called bicho, you char kway, cakwe, cakoi, kueh, kuay, shakoy or pathongko, among others.

Culinary applications and variants
At breakfast, youtiao can be stuffed inside shāobǐng to make a sandwich known as shāobǐng yóutiáo.  Youtiao wrapped in a rice noodle roll is known as zháliǎng.  In Yunnan, a roasted riceflour pancake usually wrapped around a youtiao is known as erkuai. Yet another name for a sandwich variant is jianbingguǒzi.

Youtiao is occasionally dipped into various liquids, for example the soup xidoufen, soy milk (sweet or salty), and soy sauce.

Youtiao is also an important ingredient of the food Cífàn tuán in Shanghai cuisine.

Tánggāo, or "sugar cake", is a sweet, fried food item similar in appearance to youtiao but shorter in length.

In Thailand, youtiao or pathongko in Thai are eaten for breakfast with soy milk or porridge.

Names

China
Although generally known as yóutiáo in Standard Mandarin, the dish is also known as guǒzi (餜子) in northern China. In Min Nan-speaking areas, such as Taiwan, it is known as  iû-chiā-kóe, where kóe (粿/餜) means cake or pastry, hence "oil-fried cake/pastry". In Cantonese-speaking areas this is rendered as yàuh ja gwái (油炸鬼), where gwái literally means "devil" or "ghost".

Folk etymology
The Cantonese name yàuh ja gwái literally means "oil-fried devil" and, according to folklore, is an act of protest against Song Dynasty official Qin Hui, who is said to have orchestrated the plot to frame the general Yue Fei, an icon of patriotism in Chinese culture. It is said that the food, originally in the shape of two human-shaped pieces of dough but later evolved into two pieces joined in the middle, represents Qin Hui and his wife, both having a hand in collaborating with the enemy to bring about the great general's demise. Thus the youtiao is deep fried and eaten as if done to the traitorous couple. In keeping with the legend, youtiao are often made as two foot-long rolls of dough joined along the middle, with one roll representing the husband and the other the wife. The Cantonese name may derive from Guangzhou being the last resistance front before the Song dynasty collapsed.

Cambodia
In Cambodia, it is called cha kway and usually dipped in kuy teav, congee or coffee. Some Chinese Cambodian immigrants in Australia sometimes call it chopstick cake because of its resemblance to a pair of chopsticks.

Indonesia 

In Indonesia, the fried dough is known as cakwe. It is commonly chopped or thinly sliced and then eaten for breakfast with bubur ayam (chicken porridge) or eaten as snacks with dipping of local version of chilli vinaigrette or peanut / satay sauce.

In Java, cakwe is usually sold as a street snack at kaki lima, usually at the same stalls that sell bolang-baling or roti goreng (sweet fried dough) and untir-untir (Javanese version of mahua). This snack is sometime served with spicy sweet salty sauce (optional). Savory cakwe, sweet bolang-baling and crunchy untir-untir are to be considered to compliment each other in a snack mix.

Laos
In Laos, youtiao is generally called kao nom kou or patongko (cf. Thai patongko) or "chao quay", and is commonly eaten with coffee at breakfast in place of a baguette (khao jee falang).  It is also eaten as an accompaniment to "khao piek sen" (chicken noodle soup) or "jok" (congee).

Malaysia
It is rendered in Malay language as cakoi, an alteration of the Minnan term, char kway. The name pathongko (see Thailand) is more common in the northern states of Kedah, Perlis and Penang. Cakoi is usually sold in morning street markets or pasar malam night markets and commonly eaten with coffee or soy milk for breakfast or at tea time.

Singapore
In Singapore, it is known as yu char kway, which is the transliteration of its Hokkien (Minnan) name (油炸粿 iû-tsiā-kué). Apart from the plain version, the Singaporean take on Youtiao also comes with various fillings which are either sweet, such as red bean paste or savory (ham chim peng, 鹹煎餅), such as sardines in tomato sauce. The plain version is often eaten with sweet chili sauce or coconut and egg jam called kaya, or served with bak kut teh (肉骨茶), porridge or rice congee, sliced thinly to be dipped into the broth or congee and eaten.

Myanmar 

The youtiao is also a popular breakfast food in Myanmar (Burma)  where it is called e kya kway (အီကြာကွေး [ì tʒà ku̯éː]) . It is usually eaten with steamed yellow beans (with salt and oil) or dipped into coffee or tea ,or with condensed milk(နို့ဆီ). E kya kway is also eaten with rice porridge, or cut into small rings and used as a condiment for mohinga.
Tea culture is very prevalent in Myanmar, and almost every shop will serve e kya kway for breakfast.

Some shops stuff meat into the youtiao and deep fry it over again. It is called e kya kway asar thoot – stuffed e kya kway.

Philippines  

In the Philippines, it is either known as Bicho / Bicho-Bicho (Hokkien: 米棗 Pe̍h-ōe-jī: bí-tsó) or Shakoy / Siyakoy (Hokkien: 炸粿 Pe̍h-ōe-jī: tsia̍h-kué) / Pinisi / lubid-lubid. They are usually deep-fried, in the case of Bicho-Bicho, or deep-fried and twisted, in the case of Shakoy. Dry, smaller and crunchy versions are called pilipit.

Thailand

In Thailand, youtiao is generally called pathongko due to a confusion with a different kind of dessert. Pathongko is a loanword adapted from either Teochew Minnan beh teung guai (白糖粿; Mandarin: bái tángguǒ) or Cantonese of baahktònggòu (白糖糕; Mandarin: bái tánggāo). However, both possible original names referred to a different dessert, the white sugar sponge cake. It was previously sold together with youtiao by street vendors who normally walked around and shouted both names out loud. However, Thai customers often mistakenly thought that the more popular youtiao was "pathongko". Eventually, the real pathongko disappeared from the market because of its unpopularity. The disappearance of real "pathongko" left the youtiao labeled under the former's name, while the latter's real name is generally unknown amongst the Thais.  The original white sugar sponge cake can still be easily found in Trang Province in Southern Thailand under its original name while youtiao is still called "chakoi" or "chiakoi" by some Southerners.

In Thailand, pathongko is also dipped into condensed milk or, in the South, eaten with kaya.

Vietnam

In Vietnamese cuisine, it is known by a name that is a pronunciation similar to the Cantonese pronunciation, as dầu cháo quẩy, giò cháo quẩy or simply quẩy. 油 ("dầu/giò"), 鬼 ("quỷ/quẩy") coming from the approximate Cantonese pronunciation. In Vietnam, "giò cháo quẩy" is eaten typically with congee, pho in Hanoi and sometimes with wonton noodle (mì hoành thánh or mì vằn thắn).

See also

 Fried dough foods
 List of Chinese dishes
 List of doughnut varieties
 List of deep fried foods
 List of snack foods
 List of street foods
 Zhaliang
 Ci fan tuan

Other Chinese fried dough dishes
 Ham chim peng
 Ox-tongue pastry
 Shuangbaotai

Notes

References

Chinese cuisine
Deep fried foods
Dim sum
Chinese doughnuts
Taiwanese cuisine
Thai desserts and snacks
Singaporean cuisine